Witchcraft is a song composed by Dave Bartholomew and Pearl King which was an R&B hit in 1955 for The Spiders

The Spiders' version
The Spiders' version of the song was released by Imperial Records and reached #5 on the Most Played by Jockeys chart.

Elvis Presley's version
"Witchcraft" was covered in 1963 by Elvis Presley. Presley's version was released in 1963 as the B-side to "Bossa Nova Baby" and on its own reached #32 on the pop charts.

References

1955 songs
Elvis Presley songs
Songs written by Dave Bartholomew